Microcosmic salt (see infobox for other names) is a salt found in urine with the formula Na(NH4)HPO4. It is left behind in the residues after extracting the urea from dried urine crystals with alcohol. In the mineral form, microcosmic salt is called stercorite.

The first extraction of pure phosphorus came from this salt, when Hennig Brandt attempted to extract gold from urine.

Microcosmic salt is used in the laboratory as an essential ingredient of the microcosmic salt bead test for identification of metallic radicals on the basis of the color they produce in oxidising or reducing flame, in hot or cold condition.

Microcosmic salts form a tetrahydrate.

References

Sodium compounds
Ammonium compounds
Phosphates